Von Schwelle zu Schwelle (in English From Threshold to Threshold) is a 1955 German-language poetry collection by Paul Celan.

References

1955 poetry books
Poetry by Paul Celan
German poetry collections